Justice Dean may refer to:

Arthur Dean (judge), associate justice of the Supreme Court of Victoria
Gilbert Dean, justice of the New York Supreme Court, and ex officio a judge of the New York Court of Appeals
James R. Dean, associate justice of the Nebraska Supreme Court